Trevor Hayes, better known as Stixxay, is an American professional League of Legends player for Golden Guardians. Stixxay started his League of Legends professional career as the starting ADC for CLG's Challenger NA team CLG Black and substitute ADC for Misfits. In the 2015 Spring Challenger Series, CLG Black and Stixxay finished 2–8. In November 2015 he was elevated to the main team, replacing Peter "Doublelift" Peng as bot laner. In January 2022 he stepped down as a player and transferred to a coaching role at Golden Guardians.

Stixxay won the 2016 North American League of Legends Championship Series Spring Split with CLG.

As of the 2016 Mid-Season Invitational, Stixxay led the invitational in most kills (70).

He graduated Mesquite High School in 2015.

Tournament results
 1st — 2016 Spring NA LCS playoffs
 2nd — 2016 Mid-Season Invitational
 4th — 2016 NA LCS Summer regular season
 4th — 2016 NA LCS Summer playoffs

Individual achievements 
 1x NA LCS Finals MVP (Spring 2016)
 1x MSI Group Stage All-Tournament team (2016)

References 

American esports players
Cloud9 (esports) players
Denial Esports players
Counter Logic Gaming players
Living people
League of Legends AD Carry players
Place of birth missing (living people)
Twitch (service) streamers
Year of birth missing (living people)